The Seoul Motor Show is a biennial auto show held at KINTEX (Korea International Exhibition Center), Goyang, Gyeonggi-do.  Hosted by the Korea Automobile Manufacturers Association (KAMA), It is recognized as an international show by the Organisation Internationale des Constructeurs d'Automobiles. It is the 4th largest auto show in Asia after the Tokyo Motor Show, Auto Shanghai, and Auto China.

2023
Period: March 30 to April 9 (KINTEX Hall 1 to 5)

Kia, Hyundai, Genesis and Ssangyong(KG Mobility) will partcipate in this show, and expand to UAM and mobility companies.

 Hyundai Sonata DN8 F/L - World Premiere
 Kia EV9 - World Premiere
 Ssangyong Torres EVX - World Premiere
 Alpha Rex - World Premiere
 Alpha Wolf - World Premiere
 BMW iX5 Hydrogen - World Premiere
 Ineos Grenadier - Asian Debut

2021

The 13th SEOUL MOBILITY SHOW initially run from April 1 to April 11. but in October 2020 it was changed July 1 to July 11. and postponed again from November 25 to December 5 due to COVID-19 pandemic in South Korea. Only KINTEX Hall 6 to 10 used in this show.

This show changed name from Seoul Motor Show to Seoul Mobility Show. Due to absence of GM Korea, Ssangyong, Renult Samsung and lot of KAIDA companies. Hyundai Motor Company (Hyundai, Kia, Genesis) is the only Korean company participate in this show.

 Kia Niro (SG2) - World Premiere
 Hyundai Universe Mobile Office
 Hyundai Staria Camper/Limousine
 Hyundai Casper
 Genesis Electrified GV70 - Korea Premiere

2019

The 12th Seoul Motor Show will run from March 29 to April 7. Tesla took part in the 2019 Seoul Motor show.

 Hyundai Sonata 1.6 Turbo
 Hyundai Veloster N with "N Performance" parts
 Kia "Imagine by Kia" concept (Asian debut)
 Kia Mohave Masterpiece concept
 Kia SP Signature concept
 Renault Samsung XM3 Inspire concept
 Jaguar XE Facelift (Asian debut)

2017

The 11th SEOUL MOBILITY SHOW ran from March 30 to April 9.

2015

The 10th SEOUL MOBILITY SHOW ran from April 2 to April 12.

2013

The 9th SEOUL MOBILITY SHOW runs from March 29 to April 7.

 Hyundai Equus Limousine by Hermès
 Hyundai E4U Concept
 Hyundai HND-9 Venace Concept
 Hyundai ix35 FCEV
 Hyundai Trago Xcient 6x2 Tractor
 Kia CUB Concept 
 Kia K3 Euro
 Kia K3 Convertible "Kia Tigers"
 SsangYong Chairman W Summit
 SsangYong LIV-1 Concept
 Samsung QM3 Concept
 Samsung SM5 XE TCE
 Samsung SM3 Z.E.

2011

Period: March 31 - April 10

 Chevrolet Miray Concept
 Hyundai Blue2 (HND-6) Concept
 Kia Naimo Concept
 Kia K5 Hybrid 
 Samsung SM7 Concept
 SsangYong Chairman H
 SsangYong KEV2 Concept
 Peugeot 508GT HDi
 Tata Daewoo Prima Concept

2009

Period: April 2–12

 Hyundai Avante LPG
 Hyundai Genesis Drift
 Hyundai Genesis Prada
 Hyundai HND-4 Blue Will Concept
 Hyundai Equus
 Kia KND-5 Concept
 Kia Forte LPI Hybrid
 Kia Sorento  
 Samsung eMX Concept
 SsangYong Chairman
 SsangYong C200 Aero Concept
 SsangYong C200 Eco Hybrid Concept
 Samsung SM3

2007

The 6th SEOUL MOBILITY SHOW ran from April 5 to April 15.

 Daewoo G2X Concept
 Daewoo L4X Concept
 Hyundai HND-3 Veloster Concept
 Hyundai H-1
 Hyundai FD Wagon
 Kia KND-4 Concept
 SsangYong Kyron
 SsangYong WZ Concept
 Samsung QMX Concept

2005

Period: April 28 - May 8.First SEOUL MOBILITY SHOW held in KINTEX.

 Daewoo T2X Concept
 Daewoo Lacetti Sport Wagon
 Daewoo Lacetti WTCC
 Daewoo Statesman
 Kia Bongo 
 Kia Pride
 Kia Carnival / VQ
 Hyundai HCT 6×2 Concept
 SsangYong Chairman Limo Concept
 SsangYong SV-R Concept
 SsangYong XCT Concept
 SsangYong XMT Concept
 SsangYong Rodius Limo Concept
 Proto Motors Spirra

2002

Period: November 20–29

 ATT Invita
 Daewoo Flex Concept 
 Daewoo Lacetti 
 Daewoo Magnus
 Daewoo Oto Concept
 Hyundai Coupe Aero Concept
 Hyundai Santa Fe Mountaineer Concept
 Hyundai Starex Limousine
 Hyundai HIC Concept
 Kia Carnival Limousine Concept
 Kia Opirus
 Kia Regal / Magentis
 Samsung SM3
 Samsung SM3 Sport Prototype
 SsangYong Hemos Concept
 SsangYong Amao Concept 
 SsangYong Crossut Concept
 SsangYong Musso Sports
 Proto Motors Spirra

1999

Period: May 11–18

 Daewoo DMS-1 Concept
 Daewoo Matiz Canvas Top Concept
 Daewoo Mirae Concept
 Hyundai FGV-2 Concept
 Hyundai Highland Concept
 Hyundai Santa Fe Concept
 Hyundai Starex Conversion
 Hyundai Trajet Concept
 Hyundai Tirol Concept
 Hyundai Tiburon Turbulence
 Hyundai Tutti Concept
 Kia Carens
 SsangYong Korando Camping Car Concept

1997

Period: April 24 - May 1

 Asia Motors ARV Concept
 Asia Motors Retona
 BMW 750 L7 Limousine
 Daewoo DEV-5 Concept
 Daewoo Joyster Concept
 Daewoo Shiraz Concept
 Daewoo Cabriolet Concept
 Daewoo Mantica Concept
 Daewoo Matiz Concept
 Daewoo Tacuma Concept
 Hyundai SLV Concept
 Hyundai HMX Concept
 Hyundai Tiburon Aluminum Body Concept 
 Kia Genesis Concept
 Kia KMS-III Concept
 Kia KMX-4 Concept
 Kia Zenovia Concept
 Samsung SSC-1 Concept 
 SsangYong Korando FRP Top Concept
 SsangYong W-Coupe Concept

1995

Period: May 4–10

 Asia Motors Neo Mattina Concept
 Asia Motors Retona Concept
 Daewoo DACC-II Concept
 Daewoo No.1 Concept (Version 2)
 Daewoo No.2 Concept
 Hyundai FGV-1 Concept
 Hyundai HRV-21 Concept
 Kia KEV-4 Concept
 Kia KMX-3 Concept
 SsangYong CCR-1 Concept
 SsangYong CRS Concept
 SsangYong Solo III Concept

References

External links
 Official website

Exhibitions in South Korea
Auto shows
Automotive industry in South Korea
Spring (season) events in South Korea